Balboa Productions is an American film and television production company founded and led by Sylvester Stallone. The studio is named after his character Rocky Balboa from the Rocky franchise.

History
On May 30, 2018, Sylvester Stallone formed Balboa Productions with a partnership with Starlight Culture Entertainment. Braden Aftergood was named as the executive of scripted development. That same month, Balboa Productions announced one of their first projects with the superhero thriller Samaritan. Stallone starred in the titular role, with the movie being released on August 26, 2022, via streaming, through Amazon Prime Video after Amazon's purchase of MGM. Balboa Productions was one of the studios involved with the development of Rambo: Last Blood, released on September 20, 2019. In October 2019, Balboa Productions partnered with DAZN to develop sports featured documentaries. Their first collaboration was realized with, One Night: Joshua vs. Ruiz.

Projects in development

In May 2018, Balboa Productions announced to be developing a number of projects, including: a Jack Johnson biopic, film adaptations of James Byron Huggins novel Hunter, and Michael McGowan and Ralph Pezzullo's memoir Ghost. The studio will also develop a Special Ops film written by retired Army Ranger Max Adams, alongside television series adaptations of Chuck Dixon's Levon's Trade, and Charles Sailor's Second Son. In May 2019, it was announced that Balboa Productions will co-produce the American remake of The Gangster, The Cop, The Devil with B&C Group and CA Entertainment. Don Lee will produce the project, in addition to reprising his starring role in the remake. 

In July 2019, it was announced that the studio will produce another slate of projects including: Corin Hardy's monster movie titled Arcane, The Bellhop starring Iko Uwais, and a television series adaptation of Stallone's cult classic Nighthawks. The series will be released via streaming exclusively on Peacock. Balboa Productions will also be involved in the upcoming History Channel Original series, The Tenderloin with Stallone set to direct multiple episodes. As a production studio, they stated that they would like to be "the Blumhouse of action films", referring to Blumhouse Productions' success in the horror movie genre. 

In June 2019, is was announced that Balboa Productions will produce a new television series titled, The International. Dolph Lundgren will star in the main role, with Ken Sanzel serving as showrunner, and Stallone scheduled to direct the pilot episode. The series will be released on CBS network. In February 2020, it was announced that the studio will produce Rowan Athale's film Little America. Stallone was slated to appear in the starring role, while additional funding for the project is being acquired through AGC International.

Productions

Films

Television series

References

External links
 IMDb page 
 Official Instagram

American companies established in 2018
Film production companies of the United States
Television production companies of the United States